Proteides mercurius, the mercurial skipper, is a species of dicot skipper in the butterfly family Hesperiidae. It is found in the Caribbean Sea, Central America, North America, and South America.

The MONA or Hodges number for Proteides mercurius is 3868.

Subspecies
These five subspecies belong to the species Proteides mercurius:
 Proteides mercurius angasi Godman & Salvin, 1886
 Proteides mercurius mercurius (Fabricius, 1787)
 Proteides mercurius sanantonio (Lucas, 1857)
 Proteides mercurius sanchesi Bell & Comstock, 1948
 Proteides mercurius vincenti Bell & Comstock, 1948

References

Further reading

External links

 

Eudaminae
Articles created by Qbugbot